Qarah Qush-e Olya (also Romanized as Qarah Qūsh-e ‘Olyā and Qareh Qūsh-e ‘Olyā; also known as Qara Kush Yukāri, Qareh Qūsh, Qarehqūsh Bālā, and Qareh Qūsh-e Bālā) is a village in Sokmanabad Rural District, Safayyeh District, Khoy County, West Azerbaijan Province, Iran. At the 2006 census, its population was 139, in 29 families.

References 

Populated places in Khoy County